The Great Falls Grange Hall and Forestville School are two historic buildings that served as a Grange meeting hall and as a school located in Great Falls, Fairfax County, Virginia.  The Forestville School was built in 1889 as a one-room school, and expanded in 1911 with the appendage of the Floris School.  It is an "L"-shaped wood-frame structure covered in weatherboards and topped by a standing-seam metal cross-gable roof. After closing as a school in 1922, it served as a residence and then as the Great Falls Post Office from 1959 until 1982. The Great Falls Grange Hall was built in 1929, and is a -story brick building with a gable front.  It features a front porch supported by concrete pillars in the American Craftsman style.  Both buildings are owned by the Fairfax County Park Authority.

The buildings were listed on the National Register of Historic Places in 2004.

See also
List of Grange Hall buildings

References

One-room schoolhouses in Virginia
National Register of Historic Places in Fairfax County, Virginia
Buildings and structures in Fairfax County, Virginia
Grange organizations and buildings
Bungalow architecture in Virginia
American Craftsman architecture in Virginia
Clubhouses in Virginia
Clubhouses on the National Register of Historic Places in Virginia
School buildings on the National Register of Historic Places in Virginia
School buildings completed in 1911
School buildings completed in 1929
Grange buildings on the National Register of Historic Places
1889 establishments in Virginia